Gilles' Wife is a 2004 drama film based on the 1937 novel of the same name by Madeleine Bourdouxhe. The film was directed by Frédéric Fonteyne and written by Fonteyne, Philippe Blasband and Marion Hänsel. It received the André Cavens Award for Best Film by the Belgian Film Critics Association (UCC).

Cast
Emmanuelle Devos as Elisa 
Clovis Cornillac as Gilles 
Laura Smet as Victorine 
Colette Emmanuelle as Elisa's mother
Gil Lagay as Elisa' father

External links

2004 films
Belgian drama films
French drama films
Luxembourgian drama films
Italian drama films
Swiss drama films
Films based on Belgian novels
2000s French-language films
French-language Swiss films
French-language Belgian films
French-language Luxembourgian films
Films directed by Frédéric Fonteyne
2000s French films